Simón José Muzziotti (born December 27, 1998) is a Venezuelan professional baseball outfielder for the Philadelphia Phillies of Major League Baseball (MLB).

Career

Boston Red Sox
On July 2, 2015, Muzziotti signed with the Boston Red Sox organization as an international free agent. He made his professional debut with the Dominican Summer League Red Sox in 2016, and posted a .317/.354/.383 slash line in 17 games. On July 1, 2016, Muzziotti was declared a free agent after it was discovered that the Red Sox had violated international signing rules.

Philadelphia Phillies
On July 5, 2016, Muzziotti signed a minor league contract with the Philadelphia Phillies organization. He finished the year with the Dominican Summer League Phillies, slashing .231/.286/.273 with 12 RBI. In 2017, Muzziotti split the season between the Rookie-level GCL Phillies and the High-A Clearwater Threshers, accumulating a .270/.304/.383 slash line with 14 RBI in 35 games. In 2018, he split the year between the GCL Phillies and the Single-A Lakewood BlueClaws, posting a .250/.289/.313 batting line with 1 home run and 22 RBI. In 2019, Muzziotti returned to Clearwater and hit .287/.337/.372 with career-highs in home runs (3) and RBI (28).

Muzziotti did not play in a game in 2020 due to the cancellation of the minor league season because of the COVID-19 pandemic. The Phillies added him to their 40-man roster after the 2020 season. On March 26, 2021, Muzziotti was placed on the restricted list after experiencing visa issues.  

Muzziotti was promoted to the major leagues for the first time on April 8, 2022, after the team suffered multiple injuries in the outfield. He made his MLB debut on April 11 as a defensive replacement, then made his first start for the Phillies the following day.

Muzziotti was optioned to the Triple-A Lehigh Valley IronPigs to begin the 2023 season.

References

External links

1998 births
Living people
Major League Baseball players from Venezuela
Major League Baseball outfielders
Philadelphia Phillies players
Dominican Summer League Red Sox players
Dominican Summer League Phillies players
Lakewood BlueClaws players
Jersey Shore BlueClaws players
Clearwater Threshers players
Reading Fightin Phils players
Lehigh Valley IronPigs players
Florida Complex League Phillies players
Peoria Javelinas players
Águilas del Zulia players
Venezuelan expatriate baseball players in the United States